José Joaquín Álvarez de Toledo y Caro, 20th Duke of Medina Sidonia (18 April 1894 – 11 December 1955) became Duke of Medina Sidonia in 1915.

He married in Biarritz, France, María del Carmen Maura, a daughter of Gabriel Maura Gamazo, 1st Duke of Maura, the son of Antonio Maura, a Prime Minister of the Spanish Crown.

1894 births
1955 deaths
Dukes of Medina Sidonia